PS Zealous was a passenger vessel built for the Great Eastern Railway in 1864.

History

The ship was built by the J & W Dudgeon of Cubitt Town, London for the Great Eastern Railway and launched on 23 April 1864. She was launched by Miss Alice Goodson, eldest daughter of the chairman of the Great Eastern Railway Company.

Zealous was altered in 1866 to carry cargo as well as passengers, and she was re-boilered in 1873. On 8 August 1875, she ran aground at Harwich, then refloated. She was withdrawn from service in 1887 and broken up.

References

1864 ships
Steamships of the United Kingdom
Paddle steamers of the United Kingdom
Ships built on the River Thames
Ships of the Great Eastern Railway
Maritime incidents in August 1875